Ćiribiribela is the ninth and final studio album released by Yugoslav rock band Bijelo Dugme, released in 1988. Ćirbiribela would be the band's last release (excluding compilation albums) before the band's 2005 reunion and the live album Turneja 2005: Sarajevo, Zagreb, Beograd.

Background
Ćiribiribela was released at the end of 1988. Recorded during the political crisis in Yugoslavia, the album was marked by the band's leader Goran Bregović's pacifist efforts: the album cover featured Edward Hicks' painting Noah's Ark on the cover, the song "Lijepa naša" ("Our Beautiful") featured the national anthem of Croatia "Lijepa naša domovino" ("Our Beautiful Homeland") combined with the Serbian World War I song "Tamo daleko" ("There, Far Away"), and the title track featured lyrics about a couple which wonders what are they going to do if war begins, and concludes that they are going to "stay at home and kiss".

The album recording revealed the crisis within the band. The songs "Lijepa naša" and "Evo, zakleću se" were played by studio musician Nenad Stefanović "Japanac" on bass guitar and Bajaga i Instruktori member Vladimir "Vlajko" Golubović on drums, which caused clashes between Bregović and Bijelo Dugme bassist Zoran Redžić and drummer Ipe Ivandić.

The lyrics for the song "Đurđevdan je, a ja nisam s onom koju volim" were, by Bregović's words, inspired by a verse from Đorđe Balašević's song "Priča o Vasi Ladačkom" ("The Story of Vasa Ladački").

Track listing
All songs written by Goran Bregović, except where noted.

Personnel
Goran Bregović - guitar, producer
Alen Islamović - vocals
Zoran Redžić - bass guitar
Ipe Ivandić - drums
Laza Ristovski - keyboards

Additional personnel
Nenad Stefanović - bass guitar (on tracks: 4, 9)
Vladimir Golubović - drums (on tracks: 4, 9)
Jasmin Sokolović - trumpet
Klapa Trogir
Skopje Orchestra Kardijevi
1st Belgrade Singing Society
Vladimir Smolec - engineer
Rajko Bartula - engineer
Theodore Yanni - engineer
Piko Stančić - mixed by
Trio Sarajevo - design

Reception
Rock critic Darko Glavan wrote about the album in Danas:

Rock critic Vladimir Stakić wrote in Borba:

The album's biggest hit was "Đurđevdan je, a ja nisam s onom koju volim", which featured Fejat Sejdić Trumpet Orchestra. Other hits included "Evo zakleću se", "Ako ima Boga", "Šta ima novo", "Nakon svih ovih godina", pop-influenced "Napile se ulice" and Dalmatian folk music-inspired "Ćirbiribela".

"Đurđevdan" video ban
After the album release, Radio-Television Belgrade (RTB) decided to finance and produce a video for the song "Đurđevdan je, a ja nisam s onom koju volim". The original idea was for the video to feature iconography inspired by Serbian Army in World War I. The video shoot was organized in the village Koraćica in Central Serbia. The band came to the video shoot reportedly not knowing anything about the concept of the video about to be shot. The band members were to wear insignia-less military uniforms along with old weapons, but Islamović thought it too "pro-war", refusing to wear a military uniform. Eventually, the band and the video director reached an agreement: everyone, except Islamović, wore Serbian traditional costumes, with only several of the original props used. Still, after the video was recorded, the Radio-Television Belgrade executives themselves decided not to broadcast it, fearing it might remind of the Chetnik movement.

Post release
At the beginning of 1989, the band went on a tour which should have lasted until April 1. The concert in Belgrade, held in Belgrade Fair on February 4, was attended by about 13,000 people. The concert in Sarajevo's Zetra, held on February 11, was also very successful; it was attended by more than 20,000 people. However, on some concerts in Croatia, the audience booed and threw various objects on stage while the band performed their pro-Yugoslav songs.

After the concert in Modriča, held on March 15, with four concerts left until the end of the tour, Islamović checked into a hospital with kidney pains. This event revealed the existing conflicts inside the band: Bregović claimed that Islamović had no problems during the tour, while the band's manager, Raka Marić, stated that Bijelo Dugme would search for a new singer for the planned concerts in China and Soviet Union. Bregović himself went to Paris, leaving Bijelo Dugme's future status open for speculations. As Yugoslav Wars broke out in 1991, it became clear that Bijelo Dugme will not continue their activity.

Ćirbiribela would be the band's last release (excluding compilation albums) before the band's 2005 reunion and the live album Turneja 2005: Sarajevo, Zagreb, Beograd.

Legacy
In 2015 Ćiribiribela album cover was ranked 17th on the list of 100 Greatest Album Covers of Yugoslav Rock published by web magazine Balkanrock.

Covers
Serbian and Yugoslav folk singer Zorica Brunclik recorded a cover of "Đurđevdan" on her 1989 album Eh, da je sreće (Oh, I Was Lucky).
Turkish pop singer Sezen Aksu recorded covers of "Šta ima novo" and "Đurđevdan" in Turkish language, titled "Erkekler" and "Hıdrellez", on her 1997 album Düğün ve Cenaze.
Croatian pop singer Alka Vuica recorded a cover of "Šta ima novo" on her 1999 album Balkan Girl.
Serbian pop singer Željko Joksimović covered "Ako ima boga" and "Đurđevdan" on his 2003 live video album Koncert (Concert).

References

Ćiribiribela at Discogs

External links
Ćiribiribela at Discogs

1988 albums
Bijelo Dugme albums
Diskoton albums
Komuna (company) albums